Cracking may refer to:

 Cracking, the formation of a fracture or partial fracture in a solid material studied as fracture mechanics
 Performing a sternotomy
 Fluid catalytic cracking, a catalytic process widely used in oil refineries for cracking large hydrocarbon molecules into smaller molecules
 Cracking (chemistry), the decomposition of complex organic molecules into smaller ones
 Cracking joints, the practice of manipulating one's bone joints to make a sharp sound
 Cracking codes, see cryptanalysis
 Whip cracking
 Safe cracking
 Crackin, band featuring Lester Abrams
 Packing and cracking, a method of creating voting districts to give a political party an advantage

In computing':
 Another name for security hacking; the practice of defeating computer security.
 Password cracking, the process of discovering the plaintext of an encrypted computer password.
 Software cracking, the defeating of software copy protection.

See also
Crack (disambiguation)
Cracker (disambiguation)
Cracklings (solid material remaining after rendering fat)
Cracker (pejorative)